Giovanni Ruggiero (born 19 January 1974) is an Italian male retired long-distance runner, who participated in the 1999 and 2001 World Championships in Athletics.

Achievements

References

External links
 

1974 births
Italian male long-distance runners
Italian male marathon runners
World Athletics Championships athletes for Italy
Mediterranean Games silver medalists for Italy
Mediterranean Games medalists in athletics
Living people
Athletes (track and field) at the 1997 Mediterranean Games